The Opus College of Business is the business school for undergraduate, graduate, and continuing education students at the University of St. Thomas with campuses in Minneapolis and Saint Paul, Minnesota.

Graduate programs 
The four UST MBA degree programs – the Full-time UST MBA, Evening UST MBA, Executive UST MBA and Health Care UST MBA – offer courses. As of February 12, 2020, the Full-time MBA has been suspended.

Other graduate programs include the Master of Science in Accountancy, Master of Science in Real Estate, and Master of Business Communication.

Accreditation through AACSB International and North Central Association  (NCA CASI).

Undergraduate programs 
Undergraduate students may pursue one of eleven concentrations while completing a Bachelor of Arts degree in Business Administration. Current concentrations include accounting, business communication, entrepreneurship, financial management, general business management, human resources, international business, leadership, legal studies in business, marketing, and operations management.

Over 40% of the current undergraduates at the University of St. Thomas are pursuing a major in business administration.

Executive Education and Professional Development 

The University of St. Thomas Opus College of Business has more than 200 "lifelong learning opportunities" outside of its traditional degree programs.

Executive Education and Professional Development is the non-degree division of the University of St. Thomas Opus College of Business. They offer Executive Education and Professional Development Programs to business professionals in a variety of industries specializing in business communication, financial management, general business, health care, leadership, marketing, nonprofit management, and operations including project management. Programs are held at the University of St. Thomas Minneapolis Campus.

Executive Education Programs are designed for current and emerging leaders (“high-potentials”) who will be taking on larger roles.

Professional Development Programs serve the needs of individual contributors, supervisors, managers and those who want to advance their careers, enhance their leadership capacity and achieve personal growth. Some professional development programs include the Mini MBA Program, Mini MBA in Health Care Management, Mini Master of Marketing Management, Mini Master of Business Communication, Mini Master of Project Management, Leadership Essentials Series, and Project Management Certificate Series.

Custom Programs are also available.

Instructional methods for executive education, professional development, and custom programs may include: interactive learning, case method, individual and group projects, small group discussion, simulations, executive coaching, and video coaching.

Centers and Institutes 
The centers and institutes of the University include Executive Education and Professional Development, which is where executive education and professional development programs in business communication, finance, general business, leadership and management, nonprofit management, IT, operations, and more are routinely held.

The Center for Nonprofit Management, Center for Health and Medical Affairs, Family Business Center, Norris Institute, Morrison Center for Entrepreneurship, Small Business Development Center, and Shenehon Center for Real Estate Education provide research, consultation, and program development in their respective areas of expertise.

Additionally, the Opus College of Business has affiliations with the National Institute of Health Policy, the Center for Ethical Business Cultures, and Sun Center of Excellence.

The Opus College of Business is a host of the annual Multicultural Forum.

References

External links
Official website

Business schools in Minnesota
University of St. Thomas (Minnesota)
Educational institutions established in 1985
1985 establishments in Minnesota